Kiamichi (foaled 23 August 2016) is a retired Group 1 winning Australian thoroughbred racehorse.

Background
Kiamichi was sired by Sidestep, who won the Pago Pago Stakes, the Royal Sovereign Stakes and Golden Slipper Stakes. Kiamichi proved to be Sidestep's first ever winning progeny.

Racing career

Kiamichi won her first ever race start at the odds of 13/2 when successful in a 2-year-old handicap race at Rosehill Gardens Racecourse.  Her next victory came in the Magic Night Stakes at the odds of 20/1.  She defied these odds to lead all the way and with that victory gained an automatic entry into the Golden Slipper Stakes, the richest two year old race in the world which is run the following week.

Kiamichi was one of six runners for the Godolphin stable in the 2019 Golden Slipper, and was also the least favoured of the six runners starting the race at odds of 25/1.  She was ridden by Damian Lane to an all the way victory in the race and collected first prizemoney in excess of $2 million.

Kiamichi was retired to stud as a three-year-old after failing to win any further races since the Golden Slipper.

Pedigree

References 

Australian racehorses
Racehorses bred in Australia
Racehorses trained in Australia
2016 racehorse births